Elizaville (also Ellersie, Union Corners) is a hamlet in the towns of Clermont and Gallatin, Columbia County, New York, United States.

Notes

Hamlets in New York (state)
Hamlets in Columbia County, New York